Lord Clark or Lord Clarke may refer to:

Kenneth Clark, Baron Clark, British television broadcaster
David Clark, Baron Clark of Windermere, British politician
Alistair Clark, Lord Clark, Senator of the College of Justice in Scotland since 2016
Tony Clarke, Baron Clarke of Hampstead (born 1932), known as Tony Clarke, British trade unionist and Labour peer
Kenneth Clarke, Baron Clarke of Nottingham (born 1940), long-serving British MP and minister
Tony Clarke, Baron Clarke of Stone-cum-Ebony, (born 1943), English judge
Matthew Clarke, Lord Clarke, Scottish judge